Mark Seikel (born November 14, 1950) is an American politician who served in the Oklahoma House of Representatives from the 96th district from 1988 to 2000.

References

1950 births
Living people
Democratic Party members of the Oklahoma House of Representatives